Petros Triantafyllidis (born 1947) is a Greek wrestler. He competed in the men's freestyle 52 kg at the 1968 Summer Olympics. His son also competed at the Olympics.

References

External links
 

1947 births
Living people
Greek male sport wrestlers
Olympic wrestlers of Greece
Wrestlers at the 1968 Summer Olympics
People from Siegen-Wittgenstein
Sportspeople from Arnsberg (region)
20th-century Greek people